Serbin Oleh (born March 26, 1982 in Boyarka, Ukraine) is a Ukrainian librarian. He is  Director of the Maksymovych Scientific Library of the Taras Shevchenko National University of Kyiv, and Associate Professor of Information, library science and archiving of the Kyiv National University of Culture and Arts. Oleh is specialised in the field of systematization, indexing, library and information classifications in Ukraine.

Education
 2000-2004 – The Kyiv National University of Culture and Arts, Department of Documentary Communications and International Information. Specialization: ”An expert of bibliology, manager of publishing activity”, a red diploma.
 2004-2007 – Postgraduate study in The Vernadsky National Library of Ukraine, The National Academy of Sciences. 
 2008 – “Candidate of Historical Sciences” thesis, “History, modern state and prospects of development of the library-bibliographic classifications in Ukraine”
 2009-2010 – Winner of a competition for young scientists’ research works of the National Academy of Sciences of Ukraine, receiving a grant of the National Academy of Sciences of Ukraine to conduct research work “Evolution of classifications of sciences and of the library-bibliographic classifications”.
 2010-2012 – Winner of a contest for a grant of the National Academy of Sciences of Ukraine for young scientists, grant holder of the National Academy of Sciences of Ukraine.
 2012 – Achieved the academic rank of “Senior Researcher” 
 2016 – Earned  “Doctor of Social Communications” thesis subject, “Library systematization of scientific information: theoretical and methodological principles of development”

Professional activities
 2001 – bibliographer of the department of State current bibliography guide in the Ivan Fedorov Book Chamber of Ukraine
 2002-2004 – in the Kyiv National University of Culture and Arts at the software engineer position of the book science and publishing activity department and later as a senior laboratory assistant of professional orientation work department
 2003 – researcher of the Department of State current bibliography guide in the Ivan Fedorov Book Chamber
 2004 – head of the department of State current bibliography guide in the Ivan Fedorov Book Chamber
 2006 – junior researcher and acting researcher at Vernadsky National Library of Ukraine (VNLU) in the department of development and support of electronic catalog in the Center of computer technologies.
 2008 – a thesis defense for Candidate of Historical Sciences degree, thesis: “History, modern state and prospects of development of the library-bibliographic classifications in Ukraine”.
 2009 – researcher at VNLU
 2010 – senior researcher at Institute of Library Science of VNLU. Published monograph: “Library and bibliographic classifications: historical evolution and current trends of development”.
 2011 – acting Head of the Department of Systematization of VNLU.
 2013 – spearheads the department of the scientific processing of documents in VNLU. Taught a special course “Scientific classification” and “Modern systematization of information” as associate professor of the department of Bibliology and library science for The Kyiv National University of Culture and Arts. 
 December 1, 2014- - Director of The Maksymovych Scientific Library of the Taras Shevchenko National University of Kyiv.

Social activities
From 2006 to 2014, Serbin worked in structure of organizational committee of scientific conferences and working groups on the improvement of library processes. Beginning in 2009, he became a vice-chairman of the trade-union committee and a vice-chairman of the Council of Young Scientists of VNLU. In 2010, he became a Plenipotentiary Representative of VNLU as part of the Technical Committee of Standardization "Information and documentation" (TC 144) of the Ukrainian Institute of Scientific, Technical and Economic Information.

In March 2015, he became a leader of The University Libraries Section of The Ukrainian Library Association.

Research 
Serbin is engaged in researching methodologies of creation and use of library-bibliographic classification systems, investigation of the evolution of classification systems, historical and technological evolution features of the systematic library catalogue, presentation of information retrieval languages in the Web-oriented systems and systematization of bibliographic information.

Selected bibliography
 Serbin O. Information systematization in the context of classifications of sciences evolution: monograph./ Oleg Serbin. -K.: PPC “The Kyiv University”, 2015. – 431 p. (published in Ukrainian)
 Serbin O. Library and bibliographic classifications: historical evolution and modern development tendencies/ NAS of Ukraine; The Vernadsky National library of Ukraine/ Oleksij Semenovych Onishchenko (scientific editor). –K.: NJUV, 2009. – 139 p. (published in Ukrainian)
 Serbin O. Increase in efficiency of search tools in the context of indexing of information resources / Oleg Serbin // Sci. pr. of the Vernadsky National Library of Ukraine. - K., 2013. - N 35. - P. 39 - 48. (published in Ukrainian)
 Serbin O.	Condition of library classifications in Ukraine: reliability of realities — in realness of hopes / Oleg Serbin // Scientific and technical libraries. — 2013. — N 6. — P. 76 — 83. (published in Russian)
 Serbin O. Development of classification systems as a research object, in the aspect of evolution and optimization of information systematization / Oleg Serbin // Bulletin of the Odessa National University / Series "Library Science. Bibliography. Book Science." - 2012. – Vol. 17, Iss. 2 (8). - P. 134-140. (published in Russian)
 Serbin O. Systematic character and systematization of information organization as basic reflection principles of scientific knowledge within modern library catalog//Oleg Serbin // Lib. bull. - 2012. - N 2. P. 3-10. (published in Ukrainian)
 Serbin O. Historical and technological features of evolution of the systematic library catalog: experience of the future in the past novelty/Oleg Serbin // Lib. bull. - 2012. - N 4. - P. 3-12. (published in Ukrainian)
 Serbin O. Knowledge management system as a part of science creation/ Oleg Serbin // Sci. pr. of the Vernadsky National Library of Ukraine. - K., 2011. - N 32. - P. 349 - 357.(published in Ukrainian)
 Serbin O. Table of concordances of the abridged versions of UDC and LBC as a sample of consolidation attempt of differently structural classification systems/ Oleg Serbin // Lib. bul. - 2011.- N 4. - P. 29-32. (published in Ukrainian)
 Serbin O. Conceptual representation of triad objectification from a position of knowledge classification of stoics/Oleg Serbin // Book Chamber bulletin. - 2010. - N 1. - P. 37-42. (published in Ukrainian)
 Serbin O. Evolution of scholastic knowledge classification in emanation frames of theological doctrine/ Oleg Serbin // Sci. pr. of the Vernadsky National Library of Ukraine. - K., 2009. - N 23. - P. 27-34. (published in Ukrainian)
 Serbin O. Conglomerate of the information retrieval languages as a consolidating pattern of general regulation mechanism and search of bibliographic information/ Oleg Serbin // Lib. bul.  – 2008. - N 1. - P. 3-10. (published in Ukrainian)
 Serbin O. Reading systematization as a consequence of formation of the classification system (by way of example of classification of sciences by Hugh of sain Victor)/ Oleg Serbin // Book Chamber bul. 2009. - N 8. - P.33-37. (published in Ukrainian)
Note: all originals are printed in Cyrillic alphabet.

See also
 Vernadsky National Library of Ukraine
 Kyiv National University of Culture and Arts
Library

References

Sources
 Administration in the Maksymovych Scientific Library of the Taras Shevchenko National University of Kyiv 
 Technical Committee for Standardization "Information and documentation" (TC 144)
 Biography of O. Serbin, Vernadsky National Library of Ukraine 
 In the Kyiv National University of Culture and Arts  (in Ukrainian) 
 Library-bibliographic classification
 Antonina Holovaschuk. Amid the quiet bookshelves. (in Ukrainian)  
 About Serbin O.O It is surely necessary to live in the work and for work" (in Ukrainian)  
 Google Scholar 
 Section of the University Libraries of the Ukrainian Library Association

External links
 Taras Shevchenko University Website 
 Maksymovych Scientific Library 

Ukrainian librarians
1982 births
Living people
People from Boyarka
Academic staff of the Kyiv National University of Culture and Arts